Son Ga-in (born September 20, 1987), known mononymously as Gain, is a South Korean singer, actress and entertainer, best known as a member of the South Korean girl group Brown Eyed Girls. Having debuted with her home group earlier in 2006, Gain eventually made her solo debut in October 2010 with Step 2/4 to great commercial success, and has since released a total of six extended plays. In addition to her musical career, the singer also appeared in several native programs and series, most notably We Got Married and All My Love, where she co-starred alongside 2AM's Jo Kwon.

Career

2005–2009: Brown Eyed Girls and solo projects

Son Ga-In was noticed by the existing members of Brown Eyed Girls after she was eliminated during auditions for the popular South Korean reality series, Let's Coke Play! Battle Shinhwa! She was approached by composer Ahn Jung-hoon and invited to audition at Brown Eyed Girls' company, eventually joining the group. The four members performed several small shows before officially debuting as Brown Eyed Girls in 2006. In the same year, she performed a duet "Must Have Love" with SG Wannabe's leader Kim Yong-jun, which became her first number one hit during the Christmas season.

Despite having initial successes, it was not until 2009 that her home group made a breakthrough into Korean mainstream with their hit song "Abracadabra", which was notable for the group's shift of their image and their new direction. After the unexpected success of the song, the group went on to become one of the most mentioned names of K-pop girl-groups.

Beside from her activities with the group, she also had solo activities, beginning with her appearance in 4Tomorrow, a collaboration project with 4Minute's Hyuna, After School's Uee and KARA's Han Seung-yeon. She also released a digital single, titled "We Fell in Love" (우리 사랑하게 됐어요) with then We Got Married partner 2AM Jo Kwon, composed by fellow member JeA, Kim Eana and produced by Lee Min-soo. The duet became a massive success, being her longest running number one hit on Gaon Chart.

2010: Solo career debut and Step 2/4
In April 2010, it was announced that all the Brown Eyed Girls' members would pursue their own solo careers beside the group's activities. Gain herself became the second member to start her solo activities after Narsha by releasing her first mini-album, titled Step 2/4 with "Irreversible" as the title track in October 2010, to critical acclaim from critics and public due to its strong influence of tango. The video for the track was then released on October 8, 2010, alongside the album's release. The mini-album also achieved modest success, peaking at number two on Gaon Weekly Albums Chart while the title track became her first solo number one hit. Gain worked with university professor Park Myung-soo (Seoul Arts University) on the tango-inspired choreography for "Irreversible". On December 21, 2010, "Bad Temper" was released as a digital download single. She then resumed her group activities after the end of the album's promotion.

After the promotions of Brown Eyed Girls' fourth album, it was revealed that Gain had signed a contract with LOEN Entertainment to manage her solo career.

2012–2013: Talk About S, Romantic Spring and "Gentleman"
Prior to the release of her second EP, Gain was featured on Yoon Il-sang's anniversary album Yoon Il-sang 21st Anniversary Album: I'm 21 with a cover of "For You Not To Know" (Hangul: 너만은 모르길). She also released a duet with JYP in April 2012, titled "Someone Else", to certain success, peaking at number two on Gaon Weekly Singles Chart. However it was only after the release of Brown Eyed Girls' digital single "The Original" that her sophomore EP would be released on October 5, 2012, followed by teasers of the album's content. Reunited with long-time collaborators of both her home group and her previous debut album, such as lyricist Kim Eana, producer Lee Min-soo and Jo Yeong-cheol, the album was received with positive reacts from both critics and the public, while becoming her first release to take the top spot of Gaon Weekly Albums Chart, also her best selling release to date. Its title track, "Bloom", was also her best selling track and one of her signature hits to date. On November 30, 2012, "Nostalgia" was released digitally as a single, featuring rapper Eric Mun of boyband Shinhwa.

Later on April 8, 2013, Romantic Spring was released as a collaboration project between Gain herself and Korean singer Cho Hyung-woo, who later became her labelmate. The collaborative EP debuted at number three on Gaon Albums Chart. On April 13, 2013, she was featured in PSY's music video "Gentleman", along with the "arrogant" dance which was popularized in the Brown Eyed Girls song "Abracadabra". She then returned with Brown Eyed Girls' 5th studio album, Black Box, which was released on July 25, 2013, and later appeared as a guest performer for IU's "Everybody Has Secrets" (Hangul: 누구나 비밀은 있다) on her 2013 release. In the same year Gain parted with LOEN Entertainment and joined the APOP Entertainment roster, while making her first major appearance in film with The Huntresses.

2014: Truth or Dare
At the beginning of 2014, Gain released her next EP, titled Truth or Dare, which featured lyrics from Kim Eana, Lee Hyo-Ri and JYP, along with guest performers such as Bumkey and Jo Kwon, with the former being featured in the album's first single. Considered as a "bolder" move for herself, the album was preceded by "Fxxk U", which received mixed reactions from the public due to its theme dealing with domestic violence; however, it was praised by critics. The second single "Truth or Dare" (Hangul: 진실 혹은 대담) was released on February 6, 2014, to modest success, while the third single "A Tempo" was released digitally on March 21, 2014. Later that year, Gain was featured in Pitchfork's 20 Essential K-Pop Songs list with "Fxxk U" and "Tinkerbell", the opening track for her second EP. She also appeared as KARA's Goo Hara's friend in her own reality show Hara ON & OFF at the end of 2014.

2015: Hawwah, Brown Eyed Girls' 10th anniversary and upcoming projects
It was announced that Gain would go on to release her fourth solo mini-album (fifth overall), titled Hawwah in February 2015 as a follow-up to her previous Truth or Dare EP. The album marked the first time in her solo career to feature two title tracks, followed by a Bible-influenced concept. Released in March 2015, the EP eventually debuted and peaked at number five on Gaon Weekly Albums Chart while appearing at number nine on Billboard World Albums Chart, thus became her fourth top five entry and her first to chart in the US. Its singles, "Apple" and "Paradise Lost" peaked at number two and number six on Gaon Weekly Singles Chart respectively. As of April 2015, the album has sold 4,203 copies. She was later announced as one of the participants for JTBC's Going to School, a reality television show about idols going back to high school.

During an interview with Billboard, Gain announced that her home group would return with a new album to coincide with their tenth anniversary since debuting in 2006 and the possibilities of another solo release in 2015 also. Gain released her first full album, End Again on September 8, 2016. The title track was "Carnival (The Last Day)".

Filmography and television work
Gain appeared on We Got Married with 2AM's Jo Kwon starting from September 2009. Their virtual marriage came to an end after 15 months in January 2011. She made her acting debut in MBC daily sitcom All My Love. She was the female lead Hwang Geum-ji, alongside Jo Kwon, who played the role as her younger twin brother Hwang Ok-yeop. Her character was the love interest of Yoon Doo-joon (from BEAST) character also named "Yoon Doo-joon". However, owing to schedule conflicts, her participation in the sitcom ended in May 2011. In 2013, she became one of the three main female characters for The Huntresses, along with Ha Ji-won and Kang Ye-won. She also participated in JTBC's Going to School in 2015, along with other idols such as Taemin of Shinee and Seulgi of Red Velvet.

Discography

Extended plays

Singles

Other charted songs

Collaborative singles

Filmography

Television

Films

Music videos

Awards and nominations

Footnotes

References

External links

 Official website

1987 births
Living people
Kakao M artists
Mystic Entertainment artists
South Korean women pop singers
South Korean female idols
South Korean film actresses
South Korean television actresses
Brown Eyed Girls members